Central Luzon Television (commonly referred as CLTV 36) is a regional infotainment television network, based in Central Luzon  in the Philippines. The network has the call sign DWRW-TV. The network is owned and managed by RadioWorld Broadcasting Corporation (formerly known as the Central Luzon Broadcasting Corporation), a subsidiary of the Laus Group of Companies.

The network's offices and studio complex are located on the third floor of the Corporate Guarantee and Insurance Company Building, Jose Abad Santos Avenue, Dolores, City of San Fernando, Pampanga, which also supports its secondary antenna. The network’s 10-kilowatt, 68.5m (225ft) tall BTSC stereo transmitter and primary station tower is located at C.P. Garcia Street, Clark Freeport Zone, Pampanga.

This station operates everyday from 8:00 AM to 10:00 PM (PST). In 2017, CLTV 36 was the leading free-to-air regional television channel in the country based on the AGB Nielsen survey, for two consecutive years, and was awarded as the Best Local TV Station by the Kapisanan ng mga Brodkaster ng Pilipinas, Paragala Central Luzon Media Awards and Gandingan Awards.

Background

As one of the youngest terrestrial television stations in the Philippines, it was created when Philippine Congress granted a franchise under Republic Act No. 8219 (which lapsed into law) on September 12, 1997, and duly licensed by the NTC on January 10, 2007.

It was launched on March 19, 2007. In 2008, CLTV 36 was relegated to an all-news and infotainment channel. It was in the same year that the station received the first KBP Golden Dove Award (Sonia Soto - Best Provincial Public Affairs Program Host). 

CLTV 36 pioneered extensive and frequently updated coverage of national and local elections and natural disasters that hit the region, including typhoons, northeast monsoon, among others. In 2013, CLTV 36 launched their entertainment programming thru the Star Mill Talent Search.

CLTV 36 focuses on centralized media coverage of news, public affairs and infotainment programming, covering all the provinces of Central Luzon: Nueva Ecija, Bulacan, Bataan, Tarlac, Zambales, Aurora and its homebase, Pampanga. CLTV 36 can also be seen in major areas in Metro Manila, Calabarzon, Ilocos Region, and Cordillera Administrative Region (except Batangas, Laguna and Quezon) through its signal reception from its transmitter in Clark Freeport Zone. The tower was inaugurated on December 9, 2015.

CLTV 36 is the official broadcaster of the Giant Lantern Festival every December from 2007 and the United Central Luzon Athletic Association games since 2015.

CLTV 36 was honored as the three-time Best Provincial TV station by the KBP Golden Dove Awards, organized by the Kapisanan ng mga Brodkaster ng Pilipinas (KBP) for the 2012, 2014 and 2015 edition, along with the award for their programs Balitang Central Luzon (now CLTV 36 News) (Best TV Newscast, Provincial) and So To Speak (two-time Best TV Public Affairs Program, Provincial).

In time for the station's 9th anniversary, on April 2, 2016, CLTV 36 was rebranded as CLTV 36 Metro Central Luzon. Along with the station's rebranding came its new theme song performed by the Chocolate Factory Band, and Star Mill alumnus Jeneal Mariano and Andy Pangan.

On its 10th anniversary, the station reverted to its original name CLTV 36 with its new slogan, "The Region's Infotainment Channel".

On January 7, 2018, the station reverted to its original slogan, "One Region, One Station". 

On March 22, 2019, CLTV 36, as part of the celebration of its 12th anniversary with the theme "Championing Local Pride" (also used as a slogan from 2019 to 2022), held its inaugural Social Services Conference and Expo (SocSeCon) at Robinsons Starmills in San Fernando, Pampanga.

On June 26, 2020, despite challenges brought by the coronavirus pandemic, CLTV 36 launched #SaleseMuRin with the re-usage of their 2011 station theme, "Tawag ng Panahon".

On May 14, 2021, CLTV 36 revealed its new logo during its 14th anniversary, replacing the 2007 logo, and revealed its additional programming lineup for 2021.

On May 20, 2022, CLTV 36 celebrated its 15th anniversary through a business conference and Partner Appreciation Night with the theme, "Ibalik ang Sigla, Ibalik ang Saya ng Lokal na Ekonomiya", at Robinsons Starmills in San Fernando, Pampanga.

, CLTV 36 revived one of its previous slogans "Atin 'To" (first used in early 2010's), and also revived the 2007 logo while the current logo is still used as the secondary one. Prior to the revival of its logo and slogan, CLTV 36 re-used their 2013 station theme, "CLTV 36, Kasama Mo", composed by Andy Alviz.

Programs currently broadcast on CLTV 36

News 
 CLTV 36 News (2021)‡^
 CLTV 36 Balitaan (2007-2013; 2021)‡^
 CLTV 36 Balitaan Recap (2022)

Current affairs 
 UN in Action and 21st Century (2008)
 Perspektiba (2021, new season)‡
 Dapat All: Human Rights for All (2021)‡
 Bawal Ang Tsismis Kay Sonia Soto (2022)‡
 So to Speak (2008-2016; 2017–2019; 2020; 2023)‡
 Wagi: Women Are Great Inspirations (2023, new season)‡
 Bitag Live (produced by Bitag Multimedia Network, 2023; simulcast on IBC TV 13)
 #ipaBITAGmo (produced by Bitag Multimedia Network, 2023; simulcast on IBC TV 13)

Infotainment 
 Clark In Focus (2016, 2017)
 Discover Japan (2017)
 TopPick (2021)‡
 Kalusugang SiguraDOH
 AgriTV Central Luzon (2022)
 DokyuBata TV (2023)

Religious 
 Men of Light (2007)

‡Also streamed on CLTV 36's Facebook page.
^Also streamed on CLTV 36's YouTube channel.

Formerly aired programs 

 So to Speak (2008-2016; 2017–2019; 2020)
 Tara Lets! (2016)
 Arangkada Balita (2014-2016)
 Arangkada sa Umaga (2016-2017)
 Arangkada Central Luzon (2018)
 Pasada Ala-Una (2016-2017)
 Pasada Balita (2017-2018)
 Metro Central Luzon Ngayon (2016-2018)
 Metro Central Luzon Tonite (2016-2017)
 Metro Central Luzon Weekend Recap (2017)
 Balitang Central Luzon (2013-2016; 2018–2020)
 Central Luzon Ngayon (2018)
 Alerto Central Luzon (2013-2016)
 Central Luzon Tonight (2018)
 Central Luzon Ngayon Recap (2018)
 Mornings @ Central Luzon (2018)
 Isapubliko (2013, 2016)
 CineKabalen (2021) 
 Ang Saya-Saya (2016)
 Kapampangan Animation and Live-Action Productions (2016)
 Portraits
 Klaro Panalo (2016)
 Lonely Pangets (2016)
 Wagi: Women Are Great Inspirations
 Kuwentong Wagi
 Campus Teen Drama
 TeleVShop (2016)
 Tanikala: CBN Asia Religious Drama (also aired during Holy Week on GMA Network; 2017)
 Y-fi: Young, Free Idealist
 Simpleng Usapan
 Sandigang Legal (2016)
 Opinyong Legal
 Legal Matters
 Kasaysayan Throwback with BSJ (2016-2018)
 Clark In Focus (2016)
 The Noel Jusay Lacsamana Show (2015-2016)
 Tagis Lakas (2015-2016)
 Share and Like (2016)
 Snap Shap (2016)
 Dito Po Sa Amin (2016)
 Pera Pera Lang (2016)
 Balen at Balita (2016)
 Ing Balen (2017)
 Balen (2017)
 Balitang Balen (2020)
 Biz Mode (2016-2017)
 Belly Good (2016-2017)
 Morning Chikahan
 Daily Chikahan
 Trip, Treat at Gimik
 Ayos Ka-Rehiyon
 Dayalogo
 Hamon: Central Luzon
 HB (Hamon ng Bayan)
 Bagong Hamon: Central Luzon (2020)
 Metro Business
 Social TV: Anything and Everything Central Luzon
 Star Mill
 Star Mill: Central Luzon's Search for a Star in a Million (2013)
 Star Mill Season 2: Central Luzon TV 36 Star Search (2014)
 Star Mill Season 3 (2019)
 Pasikatan: CLTV 36 Talent Search
 She Means Business
 His Life TV
 Magsilbi Tamu
 CLTV 36 Balitaan (2007-2013)
 CLTV 36 Balitaan sa Umaga
 Queng Cucina
 What's Cooking?
 Culinary Capital
 For Your Eyes Only
 Negotalk
 Negosyoso
 Spotlight
 Maski Nanu
 Sanggunian ng Fernandino
 Fernandino First
 CENTRO: TV Program of City of San Fernando, Pampanga
 Nice 1
 Talakayan sa CLTV 36
 Bagong Umaga
 OK MusiCabalen
 Bukas Bayan
 Living Spaces
 Travel Blog
 Pinoy Wise OFTV
 Saturday Night Special
 Spot Report
 Go Organic
 Aldong Maningning
 E.T.C. News
 OK si Dok (on hiatus)
 One-Stop Shop
 Salamin ng Buhay
 Big@10
 Bayan ang Inuuna: Central Luzon TV 36 10th Anniversary Documentary Special
 The Best of Mikey Bustos' Vlogs
 MANa: Maunlad na Agrikultura sa Nayon
 Public Demand
 Music Zone (2007-2020)
 Masaganang Ani, Masaganang Kita (2019)
 Aro Jericho!
 TelEskwela
 Focus (2012; 2018)
 Nanu Pa Ta? (2019-2020)
 Sing-Ka-Galing Season 2 (2018)
 Public Interest (2020)
 Kalinga ni Ria Vergara (2021)
 Si Jay at Double J (2021)
 Lugud Fernandino (2021)
 Business Unusual (2020)
 Business As Usual (2022)
 Atin Kaming K! (2020)
 Nicolette Henson-Hizon Beyond Style (2020)
 Stories on Wheels (2020)
 Let's Talk: Heart To Heart (2020)
 Sine Gitnang Luzon Originals Showcase (2017-2018)

Free TV

Analog

CLTV 36 can also be seen in 39 cable & satellite affiliates in Pampanga, Tarlac, Bulacan, Bataan, Nueva Ecija, Zambales, Rizal, Laguna (including Sta. Rosa and Calamba), Cavite, and on Cignal Channel 115 nationwide.

CLTV 36 is also aired worldwide via live streaming on its official website and via its official application for iOS and Android users.

The network also operates the radio station DWRW (RW 95.1), currently affiliated with Radio Mindanao Network.

See also
 RW 95.1 FM

References

External links 
 
 Laus Group of Companies

2007 establishments in the Philippines
Television networks in the Philippines
Television stations in Pampanga
Television channels and stations established in 2007